Leonardo Sarto (born 15 January 1992) is an Italian rugby union player who is currently  plays for Rovigo Delta in Top10. His principal position is wing.

Rugby Union career

Amateur career

Sarto was drafted to Currie in the Scottish Premiership for the 2017-18 season.

Professional career

Sarto played eight games for Zebre, starting eight, playing 783 minutes,  contributing  10 points in the 2015-2016 -  PRO12 series.

On 8 March 2016 it was announced that Leonardo would sign for Glasgow Warriors in the summer of 2016 when season 2015-16 concluded.
Sarto made his debut for the Warriors in the pre-season match against Harlequins on 20 August 2016. In late December of 2018 Sarto signed with English Gallagher Premiership side Leicester Tigers. On 15 May 2019 he was announced as one of the players to leave Leicester following the end of the 2018-19 Premiership Rugby season.

Globally, he previously played for Italian side Zebre and Glasgow Warriors in the Pro14 and for Leicester Tigers in England's Premiership Rugby. 
From 2019 to 2021, Sarto played with Italian Pro14 team Benetton.

International career

In 2011 and 2012, Sarto was named in the Italy Under 20 squad.
In May 2013, Leonardo was called up by the Italian national rugby union team for the South African Quadrangular Tournament. On his international debut against Scotland he scored his first try, narrowly losing the game 29-30. In 2014, Sarto debut his first Six Nations Championship, landing two tries, one against Ireland and one against England.
On 24 August 2015, he was named in the final 31-man squad for the 2015 Rugby World Cup.

References

External links
 
 Pro12 Profile
It's Rugby England Profile

1992 births
Living people
Italian rugby union players
Italy international rugby union players
Zebre Parma players
Rugby union wings
Glasgow Warriors players
Currie RFC players
Leicester Tigers players
Sportspeople from the Province of Verona
Benetton Rugby players
Rugby Rovigo Delta players
Italian expatriate rugby union players
Expatriate rugby union players in England
Expatriate rugby union players in Scotland
Italian expatriate sportspeople in England
Italian expatriate sportspeople in Scotland